The 160th Ohio Infantry Regiment, sometimes 160th Ohio Volunteer Infantry Regiment (National Guard) (or 160th OVI (NG)) was an infantry regiment in the Union Army during the American Civil War.

Service
Organized on May 7, 1864 at Camp Zanesville in Zanesville, Ohio, the 160th OVI was composed of elements from four battalions of the Ohio National Guard - the 40th Battalion of Brown County, the 53rd Battalion of Perry County, the 73rd Battalion of Fairfield County, and the 91st Battalion of Muskingum County.  The regiment formally mustered into service on May 13, 1864 under the command of Colonel Cyrus Reasoner and departed for Harpers Ferry, West Virginia.  Assigned to the First Brigade (Colonel Augustus Moor) of the First Division (Brigadier General Jeremiah Sullivan) of the Department of West Virginia (Major General Franz Sigel), the regiment received orders to the front on May 17, 1864 with a supply train of 200 wagons intended for the division encampment at Cedar Creek, Virginia. The regiment conducted picket and garrison duty until reassigned on May 25 to the newly formed Reserve Division (Major General Franz Sigel), Department of West Virginia (Major General David Hunter). The regiment conducted operations throughout the lower Shenandoah Valley in support of wagon trains and on multiple occasions engaged Confederate guerrilla forces under the command of Colonel Harry W. Gillmor and Colonel John S. Mosby.  Notable engagements occurred on May 29–30 at Newtown, Virginia and on June 7 at Middletown, Virginia.  The regiment proceeded to conduct operations in and about Harpers Ferry, West Virginia and Martinsburg, West Virginia. From July 3 to 7, the regiment participated in delaying maneuvers and the defense of Maryland Heights, Maryland during Lieutenant General Jubal Early's invasion of Washington, D.C. with the Confederate Army of the Valley. On July 14, the regiment conducted a 27-mile single day's march to Hagerstown, Maryland where it took charge of a wagon train full of necessary supplies for renewed operations across the theatre. On July 21, the regiment marched to Brown's Crossing, West Virginia and established a network of pickets and patrols along the segment of the Baltimore and Ohio Railroad running between Harper's Ferry and Martinsburg.  Under its guard, the railroad line resumed operations for the first time since July 3, 1864. The regiment additionally played an instrumental role in the completion of the strategic breastworks along Bolivar Heights in Harper's Ferry.  On August 25, 1864, having exceeded its term of enlistment, the regiment received orders to return home.  The 160th OVI mustered out of service on September 7, 1864 at Camp Goddard in Zanesville, Ohio.

Ohio National Guard
Over 35,000 Ohio National Guardsmen were federalized and organized into regiments for 100 days service in May 1864. Shipped to the Eastern Theater, they were designed to be placed in "safe" rear areas to protect railroads and supply points, thereby freeing regular troops for Lt. Gen. Ulysses S. Grant’s push on the Confederate capital of Richmond, Virginia. As events transpired, many units found themselves in combat, stationed in the path of Confederate Gen. Jubal Early’s veteran Army of the Valley during its famed Valley Campaigns of 1864. Ohio Guard units met the battle-tested foe head on and helped blunt the Confederate offensive thereby saving Washington, D.C. from capture. Ohio National Guard units participated in the battles of Monacacy, Fort Stevens, Harpers Ferry, and in the siege of Petersburg.

Casualties
The regiment suffered 20 casualties during its term of service; 5 men killed in action, 2 men wounded in action, 1 man captured who later died as a prisoner of war, and 12 men who died due to disease.

Killed in Action:  Private John J. Stewart (July 4, 1864, Sandy Hook, Maryland); Private Isaac N. Steers (July 31, 1864, Frederick, Maryland from wounds received on July 9, 1864 at Monocacy, Maryland); Private Peter Beth (August 13, 1864, Maryland Heights, Maryland); Private Isaac Kelly (August 13, 1864, Maryland Heights, Maryland); and Private George States (August 13, 1864, Maryland Heights, Maryland).

Wounded in Action:  Principal Musician Thomas Jackson (May 28, 1864, Newtown, Virginia); Corporal Josiah Petty (July 7, 1864, Maryland Heights, Maryland).

Captured:  Sergeant James M. Marlow (August 5, 1864, Brown's Crossing, West Virginia; Died as Prisoner-of-War on February 1, 1865 in Richmond, Virginia).

Died of Disease:  Private John T. Dutro (June 21, 1864, Martinsburg, West Virginia); Private Thomas Fry (June 30, 1864, Martinsburg, West Virginia); Corporal Isaiah M. White (July 7, 1864, Frederick, Maryland); Private Charles W. Smith (July 16, 1864, Frederick, Maryland); Private Josiah McLees (July 20, 1864, Frederick, Maryland); Corporal Lyman C. Lamb (August 16, 1864, Annapolis, Maryland); Commissary Sergeant Nathan S. Kelley (August 17, 1864, Baltimore, Maryland); Sergeant Andrew J. Wright (August 18, 1864, Maryland Heights, Maryland); Private Andrew Garrett (August 19, 1864, Maryland Heights, Maryland); Private Samuel Anderson (August 28, 1864, Crestline, Ohio); Private John Prall (August 30, 1864, Columbus, Ohio); and 2nd Lieutenant Isaac T. Cramer (September 5, 1864, Zanesville, Ohio).

Commanders
 Colonel Cyrus Reasoner
 Lieutenant Colonel David W.D. Marsh
 Major Henry L. Harbaugh
 Captain Samuel Lyons (Company A)
 Captain Andrew J. Tharp (Company B)
 Captain William H. Spencer (Company C)
 Captain Matthias R. Trace (Company D)
 Captain Simeon Seigfried Jr. (Company E)
 Captain David C. Fowler (Company F)
 Captain Henry C. Greiner (Company G)
 Captain George Ritchey (Company H)
 Captain Henry S. Finley (Company I)
 Captain George McDonough (Company K)

See also

 List of Ohio Civil War units
 Ohio in the Civil War

References
 Speer, Stuart.  History of the 160th Regt. O.V.I.: Read at the Thirteenth Annual Reunion, Held at Rehoboth, Ohio, Sept. 23, 1903 (Rehoboth, Ohio: By the Author, 1903).
 Greiner, Captain H.C. General Phil Sheridan As I Knew Him, Playmate-Comrade-Friend (Chicago: J.S. Hyland and Company), 1908.
 Cyrus Reasoner Civil War Correspondence, Eva G. Farris Special Collections, W. Frank Steely Library, Northern Kentucky University.
 Granville Fiscus Diary, 1864, Smith Library Manuscripts, Smith Library of Regional History.
 Leeke, Jim. A Hundred Days to Richmond: Ohio's "Hundred Days" Men in the Civil War (Bloomington: Indiana University Press, 1999). 
 Reid, Whitelaw. Ohio in the War: Her Statesmen, Her Generals, and Soldiers (Cincinnati, OH: Moore, Wilstach, & Baldwin), 1868. 
 Ohio Roster Commission. Official Roster of the Soldiers of the State of Ohio in the War on the Rebellion, 1861–1865, Compiled Under the Direction of the Roster Commission (Akron, OH: Werner Co.), 1886–1895.
 The Military History of Ohio: Its Border Annals, Its Part in the Indian Wars, In the War of 1812, in the Mexican War, and in the War of the Rebellion (New York, Toledo, and Chicago: H.H. Hardesty, Publisher), 1886.
 Martzloff, Clement L. History of Perry County, Ohio (Columbus, Ohio: Press of Fred J. Heer), 1902.
 Graham, A.A., compiled.  History of Fairfield and Perry Counties, Ohio: Their Past and Present. Vol. II (Chicago: W.H. Beers & Co.), 1883.
 Everhart, J.F., compiled.  History of Muskingum County, Ohio (Columbus, Ohio: J.F. Everhart & Co.), 1882.
 Pioneer and Historical Society.  Biographical and Historical Memoirs of Muskingum County, Ohio (Chicago: The Goodspeed Publishing Co.), 1892.

External links
 Ohio in the Civil War: 160th Ohio Volunteer Infantry by Larry Stevens

Military units and formations established in 1864
Military units and formations disestablished in 1864
1864 disestablishments in Ohio
Units and formations of the Union Army from Ohio
1864 establishments in Ohio